Rhabdophis lineatus, the zigzag-lined water snake, is a keelback snake in the family Colubridae found in the Philippines.

References

Rhabdophis
Snakes of Southeast Asia
Reptiles of the Philippines
Reptiles described in 1861
Taxa named by Wilhelm Peters